Sohaon is a town in Ballia district of Azamgarh division in Uttar Pradesh state in western India.

Town 
Located on the northern bank of the Ganges river, a wonderful city of Ballia is an important economic and transportation spot on the border between Uttar Pradesh and Bihar in northern India. The city is believed to be established by many saints who gave it the name of Ballia. The city has in interesting culture, with a heavy influence of Buddhism and some influence of Islamic traditions. It is also famous with a huge cattle fair, Dadri Mela, held in autumn and considered to be the second largest cattle market in the whole country.

Senduria (2 km), Amao (2 km), Govindpur Khas (2 km), Baghouna Kala (3 km), Bharouli Khas (3 km) are the nearby villages to Sohaon. Sohaon is surrounded by Buxar Block to the south, Bhanwarkol Block to the west, Simri Block to the east, Itarhi Block to the south.

Nearby villages of Sohaon 

 Dariapur
 Harbanshpur
 Tutuwari
 Pahia
 Tal Sayal
 Neura
 Champapur
 Senduria
 Kothia
 Alawalpur
 Surahi
 Narsing Patti Doyam

Buxar, Dumraon, Ballia, Rasra are the nearby cities to Sohaon.

References 

Cities and towns in Ballia district